Ascroft is an English surname. Notable people with this name include:

 Eileen Ascroft, journalist and writer
 Harry Ascroft, Australian footballer
 John Ascroft, English footballer
 Nick Ascroft, New Zealand poet and writer
 Robert Ascroft, English politician

See also 
 Ashcroft (disambiguation)

English-language surnames